David Silva Fernandes (born 29 July 1986) is a Brazilian footballer who is currently without a club, having left Legnano at Lega Pro Seconda Divisione in 2010 after the club went bankrupt.

Silva Fernandes spent his whole professional career at Italian Seconda Divisione (ex-Serie C2) and Serie D.

Biography
After played a season at Serie D side Trento, Silva Fernandes left for Pergocrema in a co-ownership bid, from Chievo in summer 2005. In June 2006, he was bought back by the Verona club., and loaned him to Varese, along with Carlo Emanuele Ferrario. His loan was extended in July 2007 and Valquinei de Jesus Santos joined him on loan. Varese also had an option to sign him outright in June 2008 On 18 July 2008, he was confirmed in Varese squad.

Silva Fernandes won Lega Pro Seconda Divisione Group A champion in summer 2009, but sold to Legnano on 31 August 2009. He was still there a year later, when the club folded.

Honours
Lega Pro Seconda Divisione: 2009

References

External links
 Profile at Lega-Calcio.it 
 
 Profile at AIC.Football.it 

Brazilian footballers
Brazilian expatriate footballers
A.C. ChievoVerona players
U.S. Pergolettese 1932 players
S.S.D. Varese Calcio players
A.C. Legnano players
Association football defenders
Expatriate footballers in Italy
Brazilian expatriate sportspeople in Italy
Sportspeople from Maranhão
1986 births
Living people